Park Shin-yang (born November 1, 1968) is a South Korean actor.

He majored in acting at Dongguk University in South Korea and studied at the Mikhail Shchepkin Higher Theatre School in Russia. 

From 1996 he won a number of acting awards in South Korea.

Career
A graduate of Dongguk University and the Shevkin Theater School in Russia, Park debuted in the drama Yuri in 1996.
He became famous after appearing in the hit melodramas  The Letter (1997) and A Promise (1998). Park earned several Best Actor prizes for his role in A Promise.

In the early 2000s, Park continued to appear in major films, such as the gangster comedy, Hi! Dharma! as well as heist thriller, The Big Swindle.

In 2004, he gained wide recognition as one of South Korea's lead actors with the television series Lovers in Paris.  With an average viewership rating of 40+% and a peak of 56.3%, Lovers in Paris became one of the most highly rated Korean dramas of all time.  Park was recognized for his performance, winning the Grand Prize (Daesang) with his costar Kim Jung-eun at the SBS Drama Awards.  The drama sparked many trends and parodies with entertainers mimicking Parks’ famous line “Let’s go, baby!” and "Why can't you say it? Why can't you say that this is my man, that this is the man I love?” in variety shows.

He has also starred in television drama War of Money (2007), which was a huge ratings hit and earned him the Grand Prize for a second time at the SBS Drama Awards. However, the producers later reneged on the deal, alleging that Park tried to capitalize on the drama's high popularity by asking for too much money. Park took legal action, and in November 2009, he won the lawsuit. Consequently, the Corea Drama Production Association (CODA) banned Park from appearing in any dramas produced by members of the association for an indefinite period.

Meanwhile, during the lawsuit, Park starred in the critically acclaimed historical drama Painter of the Wind (2008) alongside Moon Geun-young.

After a three-year absence on television, the ban on Park was lifted in 2011. He then returned in the medical drama, Sign (2011).

In early 2013, Park starred in the comedy film, Man on the Edge, which was a box office hit.

After a five-year hiatus, Park made his television comeback in 2016 with KBS2's legal drama My Lawyer, Mr. Jo. In 2019, he reprised his role in the second season of My Lawyer, Mr. Jo.

Personal life
Park married Baek Hae-jin in 2002. They have a daughter, Park Seung-chae.

In 2004, the Museum of Tolstoi appointed Park as ambassador in South Korea.

Park applied for a Master's degree program in Fine Arts and Western Painting at Andong University.

Filmography

Film

Television series

Variety Show

Awards and nominations

References

External links 
  
 

South Korean male television actors
South Korean male film actors
Dongguk University alumni
1968 births
IHQ (company) artists
Living people
Best New Actor Paeksang Arts Award (film) winners